is a quasi-national park in the Tōkai region of Honshū in Japan. It is rated a protected landscape (category V) according to the IUCN. The park includes the Tenryū-kyō Gorge of the upper Tenryū River in Iida, Sakuma Dam and its surrounding forests, Atera Seven Falls, Chausu Mountains and Mount Horaiji. It straddles the border between Shizuoka, Aichi and Nagano Prefectures. The area was designated a quasi-national park on October 1, 1969.

Like all Quasi-National Parks in Japan, the park is managed by the local prefectural governments.

See also
List of national parks of Japan

References
Southerland, Mary and Britton, Dorothy. The National Parks of Japan. Kodansha International (1995). 

National parks of Japan
Parks and gardens in Shizuoka Prefecture
Parks in Aichi Prefecture
Parks and gardens in Nagano Prefecture
Protected areas established in 1969